Megacephala thomsoniana is a species of tiger beetle in the subfamily Cicindelinae that was originally described by W. Horn in 1894, under an invalid name he subsequently replaced in 1915.

References

Beetles described in 1894
Cicindelidae